A time unit (TU) is a unit of time equal to 1024 microseconds. It was originally introduced in IEEE 802.11-1999 standard and continues to be used in newer issues of the IEEE 802.11 standard.

A whole number of such units are used to describe several intervals in that standard. The use of the term is to avoid using the term "millisecond", which is about 2.4% shorter. The unit allows for maintaining intervals that are easy to implement in hardware that has a 1 MHz clock (by dividing the clock signal in half ten times, rather than operating a phase-locked loop or digital divider to divide such a clock signal by 1000).

One time unit is equal to one millionth of a kibisecond (1 TU = 10−6 Kis).

See also
Binary prefix
IEEE 1541
Jiffy

References

External links 
 IEEE 802 Standards available via IEEE Get Program
 IEEE 802.11 Tutorial

IEEE 802.11